The Miaoli Park is a cultural center in Tongluo Township, Miaoli County, Taiwan about Hakka people.

History
The center was opened on 12 May 2012.

Architecture
The center spans over an area of 4.32 hectares.

Exhibitions
The permanent exhibition at the center are:
 Life under Hakka people house for extended family
 Traditional industries
 Traditional craft
 Traditional music
 Railway heart - Hakka love
 Colorful Hakka culture

Transportation
The center is accessible within walking distance south of Tongluo Station of Taiwan Railways.

See also
 List of tourist attractions in Taiwan
 Liudui Hakka Cultural Park

References

External links
 

2012 establishments in Taiwan
Cultural centers in Miaoli County
Hakka culture in Taiwan